Joseph William Dunning (5 November 1833, Leeds – 15 October 1897, London) was an English entomologist who specialised in Lepidoptera.

Dunning was a notary. He wrote with A. W. Pickard An Accentuated List of the British Lepidoptera, with hints of the derivation of the names Entomological Societies of Oxford and Cambridge (1859). He named five new genera of moths.

A collection of letters between Dunning and Philipp Christoph Zeller and Henry Tibbats Stainton is in the library of the Natural History Museum.

He was President of  the Royal Entomological Society 1883–1884 and responsible for its Royal Charter (obtained in 1885).

References
Musgrave, A. 1932 Bibliography of Australian Entomology 1775–1930. Sydney.
Salmon, M. A. 2000 The Aurelian Legacy. British Butterflies and their Collectors Martins, Great Horkesley, Harley Books. Portrait.

English entomologists
English musicologists
1833 births
1897 deaths
19th-century musicologists